"The Shouty Track" is a single from the Lemon Jelly album '64–'95.

It samples the track "Horrorshow" by post-punk/new wave band Scars.

As with the other tracks on '64–'95, "The Shouty Track" differs from their previous albums, Lemonjelly.KY and Lost Horizons, displaying a heavier, darker sound.

Track listing

CD1
"The Shouty Track"
"Nice Weather for Ducks (unplugged)"

CD2
"The Shouty Track"
"Baby Battle Scratch"
"The Shouty Track" video

Music video
The animated video for "The Shouty Track", produced by Airside, consists of two cartoon-like characters being drawn by an unseen hand, who then begin to head-bang to the beat of the music.  Other elements include rapid montages of images related to the headbangers' lives such as barbecue and getting tattoos, but foremost, gratuitous violence - notably both the perpetrators and victims remain mostly unfazed by the punches exchanged.

The video is included on the DVD release of '64–'95, along with animated videos for the other tracks.

References

Lemon Jelly songs
2005 singles
XL Recordings singles
2005 songs
Big beat songs